Miguel Hermosilla Ramos (20 September 1948 – 9 September 2019) was a Chilean professional footballer and manager who played as a midfielder for clubs in El Salvador, Guatemala, Chile and Bolivia.

Playing career
A midfielder from the Universidad Católica youth system, Hermosilla emigrated to El Salvador and made his professional debut with Alianza. In his first stint with the team, what was known as La Orquesta Alba (The White Orchestra), he won two league titles in both the 1965–66 and the 1966–67 seasons, the two first titles for the club in its history. At international level, he won the 1967 CONCACAF Champions' Cup.

After a stint with Municipal from Guatemala, he returned to Chile and joined Colo-Colo, winning the 1970 Primera División. In Chile, he also played for Rangers de Talca (1971), Antofagasta Portuario (1972 and 1976) and Aviación (1977), his last club.

Abroad, he also played for Águila in El Salvador and Mariscal Santa Cruz in Bolivia.

Managerial career
A historical manager of Cobreloa, he led the team in four stints, having began his career as the assistant of Jorge Siviero in the same club in 1987. With Cobreloa, he won the 1988 Primera División. He also coached Coquimbo Unido, Unión San Felipe, Rangers de Talca and Audax Italiano.

In addition, he started the Cobreloa Academy based in Santiago, where began his career players such as Eduardo Vargas, Charles Aránguiz and Esteban Pavez.

In his last years, he coached the team of the students of laws from the University of Chile.

Personal life
He was nicknamed Chueco (Bow-legged).

He died of a heart attack on 9 September 2019.

Honours

Player
Alianza
 Salvadoran Primera División (2): , 
 CONCACAF Champions' Cup (1): 1967

Colo-Colo
 Chilean Primera División (1): 1970

Manager
Cobreloa
 Chilean Primera División (1): 1988

References

External links
 

1948 births
2019 deaths
Footballers from Santiago
Chilean footballers
Chilean expatriate footballers
Alianza F.C. footballers
C.S.D. Municipal players
Colo-Colo footballers
Rangers de Talca footballers
C.D. Antofagasta footballers
C.D. Aviación footballers
Salvadoran Primera División players
Liga Nacional de Fútbol de Guatemala players
Chilean Primera División players
Bolivian Primera División players
Chilean expatriate sportspeople in El Salvador
Chilean expatriate sportspeople in Guatemala
Chilean expatriate sportspeople in Bolivia
Expatriate footballers in El Salvador
Expatriate footballers in Bolivia
Association football midfielders
Sportspeople from Santiago
Chilean football managers
Cobreloa managers
Coquimbo Unido managers
Unión San Felipe managers
Rangers de Talca managers
Audax Italiano managers
Chilean Primera División managers
Primera B de Chile managers